Photographic fixer is a mix of chemicals used in the final step in the photographic processing of film or paper. The fixer stabilises the image, removing the unexposed silver halide remaining on the photographic film or photographic paper, leaving behind the reduced metallic silver that forms the image.  By fixation, the film or paper is insensitive to further action by light.  Without fixing, the remaining silver halide would darken and cause fogging of the image. Fixation is commonly achieved by treating the film or paper with a solution of thiosulfate salt.  Popular salts are sodium thiosulfate—commonly called hypo—and ammonium thiosulfate—commonly used in modern rapid fixer formulae.  Fixation involves these chemical reactions (X = halide, typically Br−):
AgX  +  2 S2O32−    →   [Ag(S2O3)2]3−  +   X−
AgX  +  3 S2O32−    →   [Ag(S2O3)3]5−  +   X−

In addition to thiosulphate the fixer typically contains mildly acidic compounds to adjust the pH and suppress trace amounts of the developer. This compound is often an alkali hydrogen sulfite (bisulfite) which also serves to preserve the thiosulphate. Less commonly it may also contain other additives e.g. for the hardening of gelatin. There are also non-thiosulphate fixers, at least for special purposes. Fixer is used for processing all commonly used films, including black-and-white films, Kodachrome, and chromogenic films.

Chromogenic films
In chromogenic films, the remaining silver must be removed by a chemical mixture called a bleach fix, sometimes shortened to blix. This mixture contains ammonium thiosulfate and ferric EDTA, a powerful chelating agent. The fixing agent reduces the silver which is then dissolved by the chelating agent.

Washing and stabilisation 
After fixation, washing is important to remove the exhausted chemicals from the emulsion.  Otherwise they cause image deterioration.  Other treatments of the remaining silver-based image are sometimes used to prevent "burning".

References

Photographic chemicals
Photographic processes